Yesa is a Tulu-language film directed by M N Jayanth, Starring Rahul Amin, Radhika Rao, Aravind Bolar, Naveen D Padil, Bhojaraj Vamanjoor, Shobhraj Pavoor in lead roles. The movie has been produced by Uday Shetty and Uday Salian under the banner of U2 Cinema Talkies.

Cast
Naveen D Padil as Mahabhala Shetty
Rahul Amin as Abhishek/Rahul
Radhika Rao as Thanu
Bhargavi Narayan as Kinyakka
Aravind Bolar as Jaggu
Bhojaraj Vamanjoor as Daamu
Jayarama acharya as Lawyer

References

External links
 

2017 films